Matty Rich, born Matthew Statisfield Richardson (November 26, 1971 in Brooklyn, New York City), is a film director, screenwriter, and video game executive.

Career
Rich broke into the film world with the 1991 film Straight Out of Brooklyn, which was financed by credit cards and donations. Rich also plays Larry Love, a major character in the film. The low-budget independent film grossed $2.7 million at the box office and only cost $450,000 to make. Rich wrote the film as a short story at age 17, and first filmed it as an 8-minute short for himself and high school students. The film was critically acclaimed, and Rich won many awards, including an Independent Spirit Award.

In interviews, Rich had proudly stated that even though he dropped out of New York University's (NYU) famed Tisch School of the Arts after one month (he accused the faculty of racism), he still made a successful film. This drew criticism from Spike Lee, a Tisch graduate, who accused Rich of being "ignorant". Rich's second film, 1994's The Inkwell, received mixed reviews. He has not made another film since.

In 2005, Rich re-emerged as the director and screenwriter of the video game, 187 Ride or Die which was not a success.

Today, he serves as CEO of Matty Rich Games, a Los Angeles-based gaming company. Matty Rich Games specializes in family-oriented and Christian-themed video games geared toward the African-American community.

Personal
On January 19, 2008, Rich married publicist Leah "Reid" Johnson.  They presently live in Los Angeles.

References

External links

1971 births
Living people
People from Brooklyn
African-American film directors
Tisch School of the Arts alumni
African-American male actors
American male film actors
African-American screenwriters
Screenwriters from New York (state)
Male actors from New York City
Film directors from New York City